Georgiana Mitchell Smith Blankenship (1861 - January 9, 1936) wrote "Early History of Thurston County, Washington: Together with Biographies and Reminiscences of Those Identified with Pioneer Days".

Biography
Georgiana Mitchell was born in 1861 in St. Paul, Minnesota, the daughter of George Mitchell and Elizabeth Pennimer.

Blankenship was a writer.

She was identified with fraternal and club activities and was always interested in educational work. She was a member of the Olympia Woman's Club and Order of the Eastern Star. She was an officer of the Pioneer and Historical Society of Thurston County in Olympia. The Society was organized on March 2, 1910, and the requirement to be part of it was to have resided in the county for forty or more years. In 1914 she wrote "Early History of Thurston County, Washington: Together with Biographies and Reminiscences of Those Identified with Pioneer Days".

Blankenship lived in California and moved to Washington in 1890 and lived at East Bay Drive, Olympia, Washington. She first married Smith and then George Edward Blankenship (1858-1947) and had one daughter, Marion Ruth Abel.

She died on January 9, 1936, and is buried at Masonic Memorial Park, Tumwater, Washington.

Publications
She was the author of Tillicum Tales of Thurston County, an historical and reminiscent book.

References

1861 births
1936 deaths
People from Saint Paul, Minnesota
American writers
American pioneers
American women writers